Morgan Matthews is an English, BAFTA award-winning documentary director. He is the founder of Minnow Films.

Matthews' early work includes the BAFTA, RTS and Grierson nominated Taxidermy: Stuff the World, the RTS nominated Channel 4 series My Crazy Parents  and the feature-length Beautiful Young Minds which was also BAFTA, RTS and Grierson nominated.

In 2006 he founded Minnow Films, starting his work with the company with the Grierson nominated film Battleship Antarctica for Channel 4. He then went on to make The Fallen, a three-hour film for BBC2 remembering every British serviceman and woman killed in the Afghanistan and Iraq wars. The film was named best single documentary of 2008 at the RTS awards and won two BAFTAs including Best Factual Director.

Whilst executive producing at Minnow Films, Matthews continues to direct his own films with the company including the BAFTA nominated Scenes from a Teenage Killing, chronicling every teenager who died as a result of violence in the UK over one year. Matthews also executive produced the RTS nominated Minnow Films' series Fighting on the Frontline for Channel 4, which embedded three directors with British troops in Afghanistan.

Matthews has been working with Ridley Scott and Kevin Macdonald, directing the Britain in a Day project for the BBC Two and is now moving onto his next documentary, a proposed theatrical co-production between BBC Storyville and the BFI. The BFI and BBC Films are also working with Matthews on a feature film X+Y inspired by his documentary Beautiful Young Minds.

In 2013 Matthews released Shooting Bigfoot, a documentary about American Bigfoot hunters.

References

External links
Morgan Matthews at Minnow Films

Morgan Matthews Interview

Living people
English film directors
BAFTA winners (people)
Year of birth missing (living people)